Todor Simeonov (born 17 February 1976) is a Bulgarian former professional footballer who played as a defender.

References

1976 births
Living people
Bulgarian footballers
Association football defenders
First Professional Football League (Bulgaria) players
Second Professional Football League (Bulgaria) players
Botev Plovdiv players
FC Maritsa Plovdiv players
PFC Slavia Sofia players
Valletta F.C. players
PFC Rodopa Smolyan players
FC Spartak Plovdiv players
Expatriate footballers in Malta
Bulgarian expatriates in Malta